Ronald Edward George Davies (3 July 1921 – 30 July 2011) was an English specialist in airline and air transport history, and commercial aviation economic research.

Biography
Educated at Shaftesbury Grammar School, he started work in London in 1938, and was in the British Army as a territorial volunteer from 1939 to 1946. He spent a year in Iceland, training for mountain and Arctic warfare, and drove his machine-gun carrier on to the beach in Normandy in 1944. According to the New York Times, Davies made his first airplane trip in 1948. Subsequently, he worked for the Ministry of Civil Aviation, British European Airways, the Bristol Aeroplane Company and de Havilland before moving to the United States in 1968 to lead market research for Douglas Aircraft. A lifelong aviation enthusiast, Davies dedicated his work to different aspects of the airline industry, including traffic forecasting, and specializing in its history. He researched airlines at the National Air and Space Museum as the Charles A. Lindbergh Chair in Aerospace History in 1981–1982.

Davies was responsible, alongside artist Mike Machat, for the book series An Airline and its Aircraft, about selected airlines' histories, including the types flown. His writing led him to found Paladwr Press, which published 38 books of classic airline histories and biographies.

Well travelled to more than a hundred countries, Davies was a member of three British Royal Societies, the Explorers Club, and others in France and Brazil. He enjoyed a 30-year career as the Curator of Air Transport at the Smithsonian Institution's National Air and Space Museum, and continued to write and publish airline history throughout that time. A member of the Washington Airline Society, he gave lectures, and provided assistance to airline researchers. His 25th book Airlines of the Jet Age: A History was published in July 2011, just before he died aged 90.

Davies retired in 2011 and returned to England, where he died in July of that year.

Publications

Reference Works

Airline histories

Further Books

References

1921 births
2011 deaths
Aviation writers
British Army personnel of World War II
British writers
Historians of aviation
British expatriates in Iceland
People from Hertfordshire
British Army soldiers
Military personnel from Hertfordshire